Axminster Town Association Football Club is a football club based in Axminster, Devon, England.

History
The club was established in 1903 and joined the Perry Street Junior League. They won the league in 1911–12, and were champions again in three successive seasons between 1919–20 and 1921–22. The club won the league's Challenge Cup in 1922–23, 1939–40 and 1949–50. They were league champions again the following season, and in 1952 the club moved up to Division One of the Exeter & District Senior League. After winning the division in 1952–53, they were promoted to the Premier Division.

In 1958–59 Axminster finished bottom of the Premier Division, and were relegated to Division One. In 1972 they dropped back into the Perry Street & District League. The club were Challenge Cup winners again in 1979–80 and 1992–93, before returning to the (renamed) Devon & Exeter League in 2001, joining Senior Division Four. They won the division at the first attempt, and were promoted to Senior Division Two. The club won this division the following season, earning promotion to Division One.

Axminster were promoted for the fourth successive season in 2003–04, moving up to the Premier Division. They went on to win the Premier Division title in 2006–07, subsequently becoming founder members of Division One East of the South West Peninsula League. The club finished bottom of the division in 2010–11 but avoided relegation. In 2017–18 they entered the FA Vase for the first time. Following league reorganisation at the end of the 2018–19 season, the club were elevated to the Premier Division East.

Ground
The club originally played at Gravelpit Lane. In 1921 they bought a site at Sector Lane, where they played until moving to Tiger Way in 2015.

Honours
Perry Street & District League
Premier Division champions 1911–12, 1919–20, 1920–21, 1921–22, 1950–51
Challenge Cup winners 1922–23, 1939–40, 1949–50, 1979–80, 1992–93
Devon & Exeter League
Premier Division champions 2006–07
Senior Division One champions 1952–53
Senior Division Two champions 2002–03
Senior Division Four champions 2001–02
Golesworthy Cup winners 2006–07
Seaton Challenge Cup winners 1948–49, 1949–50, 1953–54, 2005–06
Morrison Bell Cup winners 1919–20, 1922–23
Devon Intermediate Cup
Winners 1977–78, 1983–84, 1986–87, 1999–2000
East Devon Senior Cup
Winners 2005–06
Football Express Cup
Winners 1910–11, 1912–13

Records
Best FA Vase performance: First qualifying round, 2017–18

See also
Axminster Town A.F.C. players

References

External links
Official website

Football clubs in England
Football clubs in Devon
Association football clubs established in 1903
1903 establishments in England
Perry Street and District League
Devon and Exeter Football League
South West Peninsula League
Axminster